Frederick Monk may refer to:

 Frederick Arthur Monk (1884–1954), Quebec politician
 Frederick Debartzch Monk (1856–1914), Canadian lawyer and politician